In mathematics, particularly in algebraic topology, Alexander–Spanier cohomology is a cohomology theory for  topological spaces.

History

Definition

 is a cochain subcomplex of  so we define a quotient cochain complex .

Induced homomorphism
Given a function  which is not necessarily continuous, there is an induced cochain map

defined by 

If  is continuous, there is an induced cochain map

Relative cohomology module

The resulting cohomology theory is called the Alexander (or Alexander-Spanier) cohomology theory

Cohomology theory axioms
 (Dimension axiom) If  is a one-point space, 
 (Excision axiom) For topological pair , if  is an open subset of  such that , then .
 (Homotopy axiom) If  are homotopic, then

Alexander cohomology with compact supports
A subset  is said to be cobounded if  is bounded, i.e. its closure is compact.

Similar to the Alexander cohomology module, one can get a cochain complex  and a cochain complex .

Induced homomorphism of this cohomology is defined as the Alexander cohomology theory.

Under this definition, we can modify homotopy axiom for cohomology to a proper homotopy axiom if we define a coboundary homomorphism  only when  is a closed subset. Similarly, excision axiom can be modified to proper excision axiom i.e. the excision map is a proper map.

Property
One of the most important property of this Alexander cohomology module with compact support is the following theorem:

Example

Relation with tautness

Using this tautness property, one can show the following two facts:
Let  be a closed continuous map such that  induces a one-to-one map of  onto . Then for all  and all , 
 (Weak continuity property) Let  be a family of compact Hausdorff pairs in some space, directed downward by inclusion, and let . The inclusion maps  induce an isomorphism
.

Difference from singular cohomology theory
Recall that the singular cohomology module of a space is the direct product of the singular cohomology modules of its path components.

A nonempty space  is connected if and only if . Hence for any connected space which is not path connected, singular cohomology and Alexander cohomology differ in degree 0.

In particular, if  is the collection of components of a locally connected space , there is a natural isomorphism .

Variants
It is also possible to define Alexander–Spanier homology and Alexander–Spanier cohomology with compact supports.

Connection to other cohomologies
The Alexander–Spanier cohomology groups coincide with Čech cohomology groups for compact Hausdorff spaces, and coincide with singular cohomology groups for locally finite complexes.

References

Bibliography

Cohomology theories
Duality theories